Marco McDonald (born 31 August 1977) is a Jamaican former football defender who last played for Waterhouse F.C.

Career
Nicknamed 'Snake', the no nonsense defender has also played for Tivoli Gardens F.C. in the Jamaica National Premier League.

The player turns out for the most celebrated team in West Kingston, Tivoli Gardens. He is a firm favorite with the highly political partisan crowds who flock to the Railway Oval game after game.

Marco is a player who demonstrates maturity on the playing field, be it in an attacking or defensive role. He is quite calm under pressure and displays good positioning and judgment. This perhaps explains why he is so infrequently booked. To focus on his defensive abilities would not be doing justice to this rising young star. He is extremely comfortable with the ball at his feet, and can be counted on to launch effective counterattacking moves.

International career
He made his debut for the Reggae Boyz in 1998 against Macedonia and played his last in 2003 against Mexico, collecting a total of 29 caps (no goals scored). McDonald is one of the players that is seen by many as the future to the Reggae Boyz back-line. He is a no-nonsense defender and hard-nose tackler who has been steadily improving as he moves from the junior to the senior ranks. During the ill-fated 2000 Olympic qualifiers in Mexico, Marco was given the captain's armband, justifying the views of many that he is one to watch for the future.

References

Jamaican footballers
Jamaica international footballers
Waterhouse F.C. players
2000 CONCACAF Gold Cup players
2003 CONCACAF Gold Cup players
Tivoli Gardens F.C. players
1977 births
Living people
Association football defenders